Kankanaey, or Kankanay, may be:

Kankanaey people
Kankanaey language

Language and nationality disambiguation pages